Monte Crostis (el.) is a mountain in the Carnic Alps, located in the region of Friuli-Venezia Giulia, Italy.  The Giro d'Italia intended to pass Monte Crostis in 2011, but after the death of Wouter Weylandt and ongoing protests of the peloton, the jury decided to remove the Crostis from the route.

References

External links
Photos, information and elevation profile for climb 

Mountains of the Alps
Mountains of Italy